The 1999 Egger Tennis Festival was a women's tennis tournament played on outdoor clay courts. It was the 29th edition of the Austrian Open, and was part of the Tier IV Series of the 1999 WTA Tour. It took place in Pörtschach, Austria, from July 5 through July 11, 1999.

Entrants

Seeds

Other entrants
The following players received wildcards into the singles main draw:
  Li Fang
  Patricia Wartusch
  Marion Maruska

The following players received entry from the singles qualifying draw:

  Ángeles Montolio
  Adriana Gerši
  Anna Földényi
  Lenka Němečková

The following players received entry from the doubles qualifying draw:

  Barbara Schwartz /  Patricia Wartusch

Finals

Singles

 Karina Habšudová defeated  Silvija Talaja, 2–6, 6–4, 6–4
 It was Habšudová's first career title after losing in three finals.

Doubles

 Silvia Farina /  Karina Habšudová defeated  Olga Lugina /  Laura Montalvo, 6–4, 6–4

External links
 ITF tournament edition details
 Tournament draws

Egger Tennis Festival
Egger Tennis Festival
Egger Tennis Festival
Egger Tennis Festival